John Finlayson (c. 1730–1776) was an English engraver.

Finlayson was born about the year 1730, and worked in London. In 1773 he received a premium from the Society of Arts, and about three years after this he died. He engraved in mezzotint several portraits, and a few plates of historical subjects.

Selected Portraits
The Duchess of Gloucester; after Sir Joshua Reynolds.
Lady Charles Spenoer; after the same.
Lady Elizabeth Melbourne; after the same.
The Earl of Buchan; after the same.
Miss Wynyard; after the same.
Lady Broughton; after Cotes.
The Duke of Northumberland; after Hamilton.
Miss Metcalfe; after Hone.

Signora Zamperini, in 'La Buona Figliuola' ; after the same.
William Drummond, Scotch historian; after C. Janssens.
Shooter, Beard, and Dunstall, in 'Love in a Village' ; after Zoffany.

Subjects
Candaules, King of Lydia, showing his Queen coming out of the Bath to his favourite Gyges; after his own design.
A. Collier, with his Pipe; after J. Weenix.

References
 

1730 births
1776 deaths
English engravers
Artists from London